Jan (Janka) Stankievič (also called Ian Stankevich, ; 26 November 1891 – 16 August 1976) was a Belarusian politician, Nazi collaborator, linguist, historian and philosopher.

Biography 
Jan Stankievič was born in the village Arlianiaty near Ashmyany. During World War I, Stankievič served in the army of the Russian Empire. Starting in 1917–1918, he began to actively participate in activities of Belarusian national organizations.

Jan Stankievič graduated from the Vilnia Belarusian Gymnasium in 1921 and the Charles University in Prague in 1926, and became Doctor of Slavonic philology and history. Between 1928 and 1932 he worked as a Belarusian language professor at the University of Warsaw, and from 1927 to 1940 at the University of Vilnius.

Between 1928 and 1930, Stankievič was member of the Polish Sejm. As a politician, Stankievič advocated closer ties of Belarus and Poland, for what he has been often criticized by other West Belarusian politicians. He also actively proposed the name of Great Lithuania for Belarus considering Litvin traditions of Belarusian statehood.

In 1940, Stankievič went to Warsaw and joined the Nazi collaborationist pro-German Belarusian Committee. He also created a pro-Polish Belarusian group called the Belarusian Nationalist Party.

In fall 1941, Stankievič moved to the Nazi-occupied Minsk, where he worked at the science department of the pro-Nazi puppet administrative body, the Belarusian Central Rada. He was member of the Belarusian Self-Help and was among founders of a Belarusian Scientific Society.

In 1944, Jan Stankievič emigrated to Germany with the retreating German military.

In 1949, he moved to the United States where he continued his work. Jan Stankievič was an active member of the Belarusian diaspora.

Stankievič is buried at the Saint Euphrosynia Belarus Orthodox Church Cemetery in South River, New Jersey.

The younger brother of Jan Stankievič, Adam, was a notable Belarusian Roman Catholic priest and Christian Democratic politician killed by Bolsheviks.

Works
 «Крыўя-Беларусь у мінуласьці»
 «Курс гісторыі Крывіі-Беларусі»
 «Этнаграфічныя й гістарычныя тэрыторыі й граніцы Беларусі»
 «Повесьці й апавяданьні беларускіх (крывіцкіх) летапісцаў»
 «Беларускія плямёны»

External links
 Biography on slounik.org
 Kitabs, the unique highlight of the Belarusian language

1891 births
1976 deaths
People from Smarhon’ District
People from Oshmyansky Uyezd
Belarusian nationalists
Belarusian politicians
Members of the Rada of the Belarusian Democratic Republic
Members of the Sejm of the Second Polish Republic (1928–1930)
20th-century Belarusian historians
Belarusian male writers
Linguists from Belarus
Belarusian emigrants to the United States
Charles University alumni
Academic staff of Vilnius University
Russian military personnel of World War I
Belarusian people of World War I
20th-century linguists
Male non-fiction writers